Julia and Julia is a 1987 Italian drama film directed by Peter Del Monte. The screenplay by Silvia Napolitano, Sandro Petraglia, Joseph Minion, and Del Monte is based on a story by Napolitano.

Synopsis
Julia is a young American woman living in Trieste, Italy who is widowed on her wedding day when her husband Paolo is killed in a car accident where she is partly to blame. Six years later, Julia still lives in Trieste and works full-time at a local tourist travel office. She still keeps in close touch with Paolo's mother and father, but is cold and distant to her co-workers at the office and refuses to move on with her life or resume dating.

One evening after work, Julia drives her car through a mysterious and supernatural mist before returning to her apartment only to discover a strange woman living there. Across the street, in the elegant home she and Paolo had purchased and which she never sold, she finds him and their five-year-old son, Marco, treating her as if they have been together all along and the fatal car accident never happened. Paolo is a workaholic dedicated to his career as a ship designer and a restless Julia has taken British photographer Daniel as a lover.

Bewildered but happy to have her husband back, Julia tries to mend her marriage, but suddenly finds herself once again widowed and alone two days later when she finds herself transported back to the current reality that she knows. Over the next several weeks, Julia begins to slip back and forth between two different worlds, but she finds it increasingly difficult to determine which is reality and which is fantasy and begins to question her own sanity.

Julia's two worlds begin to become more similar when, in her widowed world, she meets Daniel after he walks into the travel office and smitten with him, she asks him out on a date. Reluctant at first, Daniel accepts Julia's offer and soon they become involved in a sexual relationship just like her extramarital tryst with Daniel in Julia's fantasy world with her husband being alive. When Daniel becomes more possessive and controlling with Julia, she tries to break it off but he refuses to let their relationship end. Determined to free herself from a loveless romance, Julia ends up killing Daniel by stabbing him to death in his hotel room one evening and then dumping the body into the bay.

Finally free from her relationship with Daniel, Julia then quits her job and now focuses entirely on her romance with Paolo and their son. However, several days later, while walking to the market to do food shopping, Julia is picked up by the police who question her about Daniel's disappearance. When pressed to give an alibi for the day Daniel went missing, Julia tells the police investigator that she was with her husband despite having a sexual romance with Daniel. When the inspector tells Julia that her husband was dead for the last six years, Julia breaks down refusing to believe that Paolo is dead and soon after confesses to killing Daniel.

In the final scene, Julia is seen residing in a mental hospital where she tells Paolo's visiting mother that she now feels at peace with herself. Julia now spends all her time alone in her room writing letters to Paolo and his parents while she keeps one memento that she took from her fantasy world: a photo of her, Paolo and Marco together. It is left ambiguous if the family photo is real or just a figment of Julia's imagination of her fantasy world.

Production notes
The film debuted at the Venice Film Festival in 1987 and was given limited release in the United States in January of the following year by Cinecom Pictures and earned $901,364. It was released in foreign markets as Giulia e Giulia.

This was the first feature shot using the Sony HDVS wideband analog high-definition video technique and then transferred to 35mm film.

Principal cast
 Kathleen Turner as Julia 
 Gabriel Byrne as Paolo 
 Sting as Daniel Osler 
 Gabriele Ferzetti as Paolo's Father 
 Angela Goodwin as Paolo's Mother
 Alexander Van Wyk as Marco
 Renato Scarpa as Police Inspector 
 John Steiner as Alex
 Yorgo Voyagis as Goffredo
 Lidia Broccolino as Carla

Principal production credits
 Film producers: Francesco Pinto, Gaetano Stucchi
 Film score: Maurice Jarre    
 Cinematography: Giuseppe Rotunno    
 Production design: Mario Garbuglia 
 Costume design: Nino Cerruti, Danda Ortona 
 Film editing: Michael Chandler

Critical reception
In his review in The New York Times, Vincent Canby called the film "a not-very-spooky melodrama" and added, "[it] is minor movie making, but it does prove two things: that Kathleen Turner has become the kind of star who can carry even third-rate fiction without losing her beautiful, voluptuous cool, and that high-definition tape (on which this was initially shot) can be transferred to film and look as good as anything shot on film to start with."

Roger Ebert of the Chicago Sun-Times observed "The construction of the story is ingenious and perverse and has a kind of inner logic of its own...This is the kind of movie that proves unbearably frustrating to some people, who demand explanations and resent obscurity. I have seen so many movies recently in which absolutely everything could be predicted that I found Julia and Julia perversely entertaining."

In the Washington Post, Rita Kempley described the film as "peculiar" and added "The unstable Julia must have seemed like a juicy opportunity for Turner, who likes to test herself with diverse roles."

References

External links

 
 
 

1987 films
Italian mystery drama films
1980s mystery drama films
Films directed by Peter Del Monte
Films scored by Maurice Jarre
Films set in Trieste
Alternate timeline films
1987 drama films
English-language Italian films
1980s English-language films
1980s Italian films